Margaret Ethel MacDonald ( Gladstone; 20 July 18708 September 1911) was a British feminist, social reformer, and wife of Labour politician Ramsay MacDonald from 1896 until her death from blood poisoning in 1911.

Biography

Margaret Gladstone was born on 20 July 1870 in Kensington, London, to John Hall Gladstone, later Fullerian Professor of Chemistry at the Royal Institution. She was educated both at home and at Doreck College in Bayswater. Early in adulthood she was involved in voluntary social work, including visits for the Charity Organisation Society in Hoxton. Her half sister was Isabella Holmes, who later became a noted social reformer, and an expert on London's burial grounds.
By 1890, Margaret was a keen socialist, influenced by the Christian socialists and the Fabian Society.

In 1894, she joined the Women's Industrial Council, serving on several committees and organising the enquiry into home work in London, which was published in 1897. She met Ramsay MacDonald through this work in 1895 and they married in 1896. She was comfortably off, although not wealthy. This allowed them to indulge in foreign travel, visiting Canada and the United States in 1897, South Africa in 1902, Australia and New Zealand in 1906, and India several times.
 
After her marriage she was concerned about the need for skilled work and training for women and played a key part in establishing the first trade schools for girls in 1904. She continued this work until 1910.

She was a member of the National Union of Women Workers. She served on the executive of the National Union of Women's Suffrage Societies, and she was opposed to militant action. In 1906 she became involved in the formation of the Women's Labour League, serving as chair until her death in 1911.

The marriage to Ramsay MacDonald was a very happy one, and they had six children, including Malcolm MacDonald (1901–1981), who had a prominent career as a politician, colonial governor, and diplomat; and Ishbel MacDonald (1903–1982), official hostess to her father. After Margaret MacDonald's death on 8 September 1911, Ramsay MacDonald became Prime Minister of the United Kingdom three times but did not remarry.

Monument

The Memorial to Margaret MacDonald was said to be designed by her husband, and sculpted by Richard Reginald Goulden. It was unveiled in 1914 in the garden of Lincoln's Inn Fields, London.

References

Further reading
Margaret Ethel Macdonald by James Ramsay MacDonald, Hodder and Stoughton, 1913

1870 births
1911 deaths
People from Kensington
Spouses of British politicians
British reformers
British social reformers
British feminists
British Christian socialists
Female Christian socialists
British socialist feminists
National Council of Women of Great Britain members